Hal Jacobson is a Democratic Party member of the Montana House of Representatives, representing District 82 since 2000.

Birth
Hal Jacobson was born on 19 November 1950 in Helena, Montana.

Religion
Hal Jacobson is part of the Episcopalian religion.

Family
Hal Jacobson is married to Mary.

Education
Jaconson received his BA at Carroll College in 1977.

Experience

Political experience
Jacobson has had the following political experience:
Representative, Montana State House of Representatives, 2000–2008.

Professional Experience
Jacobson has had the following professional experience:
Office Administrator, Hester/Jacobson, 1980-2006

Caucuses/Non-Legislative Committees
Jacobson has been a part of the following committees:
Board Member, Gateway Economic Development, 2004–present
State Capitol Advisory Group, 1997–present
Council Member, United States Forest Service Resource Advisory Board, 2006
Board Member, Montana Vocational Education Council, 1986-1988

External links
Montana House of Representatives - Hal Jacobson official MT State Legislature website
Project Vote Smart - Representative Hal Jacobson (MT) profile
Follow the Money - Hal Jacobson
2008 Montana Senate campaign contributions
2006 2004 2002 2000 1994 Montana House campaign contributions

References

Members of the Montana House of Representatives
1950 births
Living people